Fiddletown is a semi-rural suburb of Sydney, in the state of New South Wales, Australia, 39 kilometres north of the Sydney central business district, in the local government area of Hornsby Shire and is part of the Hills District region.

Landmarks
Fiddletown is a quiet rural suburb which features many orchards and rural properties. Fiddletown is home to a telephone exchange and Northholm Grammar School.

History
Fiddletown was named after two brothers named Henstock and another young man named Small, who took up selections in the area. Each had a violin or fiddle. Areas here were mined for sandstone and people who came to work there lived in caravans and grew orange orchards, which can still be found in Marramarra National Park.

In recent years, the Geographical Names Board of New South Wales debated its amalgamation into the adjacent suburb of Arcadia. However, this attempt was unsuccessful.

There is also a Fiddletown, California in the United States.

References

External links
  [CC-By-SA]

Suburbs of Sydney
Hornsby Shire